The Bayer designation Iota Librae (ι Lib / ι Librae) is shared by two star systems, in the constellation Libra:
ι¹ Librae (24 Librae), also known simply as ι Librae (iota Librae) 
ι² Librae (25 Librae)

Librae, Iota
Libra (constellation)